John Joseph Mullen (6 June 1829 – 17 November 1897) was a member of the Queensland Legislative Council.

Mullen was born in Dublin, Ireland in 1829 to Joseph Denis Mullen and his wife Mary Alice (née MacDonnell). He studied at King's and Queen's College of Physicians, Dublin and graduated as a surgeon.

Mullen was appointed to the Queensland Legislative Council in 1872 and served for eleven years before having his seat declared vacant in 1883. Mullen died in Brisbane in 1897 and was buried in Toowong Cemetery.

References

Members of the Queensland Legislative Council
1829 births
1897 deaths
19th-century Australian politicians